Tropimetopa simulator is a species of beetle in the family Cerambycidae, and the only species in the genus Tropimetopa. It was described by Pascoe in 1856.

References

Astathini
Beetles described in 1856
Monotypic beetle genera